The 1920 Stanford football team represented Stanford University in the 1920 college football season. They were coached by Walter D. Powell in his only season coaching the football team. Home games were played on campus at Stanford Field.

On November 6, Stanford defeated Washington 3–0 in Seattle. It was the final game ever at Denny Field, the predecessor of Husky Stadium, which opened three weeks later.

Schedule

References

Stanford
Stanford Cardinal football seasons
Stanford football